Lynne-Marie Freh (born 19 October 1954) is an Australian sport shooter. She competed at the 1992 Summer Olympics in the women's 25 metre pistol event, in which she placed seventh, and the women's 10 metre air pistol event, in which she tied for 39th place.

References

1954 births
Living people
ISSF pistol shooters
Australian female sport shooters
Shooters at the 1992 Summer Olympics
Olympic shooters of Australia
20th-century Australian women
21st-century Australian women